The 2019 South Alabama Jaguars football team represented the University of South Alabama in the 2019 NCAA Division I FBS football season. The Jaguars played their home games at Ladd–Peebles Stadium in Mobile, Alabama, and competed in the West Division of the Sun Belt Conference. They were led by second-year head coach Steve Campbell.

The season was the Jaguars' final season at Ladd–Peebles Stadium, where the Jaguars played since their first season in 2009. The university is scheduled to open a new on-campus venue, Hancock Whitney Stadium, for the 2020 season.

Previous season
The Jaguars finished the 2018 season 3–9, 2–6 in Sun Belt play to finish in fourth place in the West Division.

Preseason

Sun Belt coaches poll

Preseason All-Sun Belt Teams

Schedule

Personnel

Coaching staff

Game summaries

at No. 24 Nebraska

Jackson State

Memphis

at UAB

at Louisiana–Monroe

Georgia Southern

at Troy

No. 21 Appalachian State

at Texas State

Louisiana

at Georgia State

Arkansas State

References

South Alabama
South Alabama Jaguars football seasons
South Alabama Jaguars football